The 2002–03 Memphis Tigers men's basketball team represented the University of Memphis in the 2002–03 college basketball season, the 82nd season of Tiger basketball. The Tigers were coached by third-year head coach John Calipari, and they played their home games at the Pyramid Arena in Memphis, Tennessee.

Roster

Schedule and results

|-
!colspan=9 style=| Regular Season

|-
!colspan=9 style=| Conference USA tournament

|-
!colspan=9 style=| NCAA tournament

Rankings

References

Memphis Tigers men's basketball seasons
Memphis
Memphis
Memphis
Memphis